Flight 411 may refer to:
British European Airways Flight 411, crashed on 14 March 1957
Mohawk Airlines Flight 411, crashed on 19 November 1969
Olympic Airways Flight 411, had an engine explode on 9 August 9, 1978
Aeroflot Flight 411, crashed on 6 July 1982

0411